Galati Fresh Market is a small chain of supermarkets in Toronto, founded in 1958. The chain emerged from the Galati Brothers. There is only one location currently in existence:

 5845 Leslie Street — south of Steeles 

Former locations include:
 4734 Jane Street, North York — near Steeles Avenue West
 666 Burnhamthorpe Road, Etobicoke — between Hwy 427 & Dixie Rd. It opened 2008 and closed 2013 to become Yi Xing Chinese supermarket and then Shoppers Drug Mart.
 1105 Wilson Avenue at Keele Street — operated as Galati Brothers. It is now Btrust, a Chinese supermarket.
 415 The Westway, Etobicoke — one of the first to close; the location is now Shoppers Drug Mart

See also
List of Canadian supermarkets

External links 
 

1958 establishments in Ontario
Companies based in North York
Retail companies established in 1958
Supermarkets of Canada
Privately held companies of Canada
Canadian companies established in 1958